Electoral district XII (Croatian: XII. izborna jedinica) is one of twelve electoral districts of Croatian Parliament.

Electorate 

Electoral district for national minorities in Croatia elects their representatives with the district covering all of Croatia.

Election

Serbs

2000 Elections

2003 Elections

2007 Elections

2011 Elections

2015 Elections

2016 Elections

2020 Elections

Hungarians

2000 Elections

2003 Elections

2007 Elections

2011 Elections

2015 Elections

2016 Elections

2020 Elections

Italians

2000 Elections

2003 Elections

2007 Elections

2011 Elections

2015 Elections

2016 Elections

2020 Elections

Czechs-Slovaks

2000 Elections

2003 Elections

2007 Elections

2011 Elections

2015 Elections

2016 Elections

2020 Elections

Ex-YU

2003 Elections

2007 Elections

2011 Elections

2015 Elections

2016 Elections

2020 Elections

Others

2000 Elections

2003 Elections

2007 Elections

2011 Elections

2015 Elections

2016 Elections

2020 Elections

References 

Electoral districts in Croatia